Poppy seed paste, also known as mohn, is a common ingredient in Ashkenazi Jewish pastries and desserts. It is made from ground poppy seeds and additional sweeteners. Examples of pastries featuring the filling include mohn kichel, babka, and, most famously, hamantashen. In Jewish cuisine, the filling is traditionally referred to as mohn, the word for poppy in both Yiddish and German. Poppy seed-filled pastries are particularly associated with the holiday of Purim.

Description

Poppy seed paste generally has a very thick, paste-like consistency similar to peanut butter or a thick custard, which can grow hard during cooking. It is typically sweet but has been said to have a subtle bitterness and citrus notes due to the poppy seeds. Sometimes lemon or orange zest is added to further accentuate these notes. As the poppy seeds have been ground to a powdery consistency, they have less of a tendency to get stuck in people's teeth than whole poppy seeds.

In Ashkenazi Jewish cuisine, there are two main kinds of poppy seed filling used in order to accommodate kosher dietary laws. Dairy mohn, which may contain milk, heavy cream, and/or butter; and which is used in baked goods such as hamantaschen which are made with a dough containing dairy and which will be served with a dairy meal. And pareve (non-dairy) poppy seed filling which typically replaces the milk with water and the butter with margarine or oil, and is used in pastries that are meant to be served with meat meals such as mohn rolls, pareve hamantaschen, etc. Pareve poppy seed filling is also suitable for vegan recipes.

History 
Poppy seeds were one of the most popular spices in medieval Central Europe, known as mohn in German and Yiddish and mák in Hungarian.

Traditionally, poppy seed filling was almost exclusively prepared at home. Immigrants brought poppy seeds to the United States, with the first recipes for poppy seed cookies attested as early as 1889 in cookbooks published by German-Jewish immigrants. Beginning in the 20th century, various commercially-made canned varieties by brands such as "Solo" became available and are still sold online and in grocery stores in areas of the United States with significant Jewish populations such as the Northeast, Southern California, and South Florida. Homemade and premade renditions have significant differences in ingredients, and premade filling is generally dairy-free. Some assert that homemade filling is of superior quality as packaged poppy seed filling often contains ingredients such as high fructose corn syrup, and preservatives.

Use in religious festivals
Pastries featuring poppy seed filling are associated with holidays in several cultures. In Ashkenazi Jewish culture, poppy seed-filled hamantashen (translated as "Haman's ears" or "Haman's pockets") are a traditional pastry eaten during Purim, and are one of the most well-known uses of poppy seed filling.

Preparation

Poppy seed paste is prepared by grinding poppy seeds in a coffee grinder, blender, or food processor for several minutes until they reach a powdery consistency but before they turn into a paste. Grinding the poppy seeds helps release their natural oils which enhances the flavor of the final product, as well as theirs starches which help thicken the filling, and it also helps the poppy seeds not get stuck in the eater's teeth.

Depending on the recipe, milk (or water) and sugar (or sometimes honey or silan) are simmered in a saucepan until the sugar dissolves and the liquid is thoroughly heated. The ground poppy seeds, along with a flavoring such as lemon zest or vanilla extract is added, and sometimes other ingredients such as chopped walnuts are added. The mixture is then stirred continuously until it thickens and reaches a jam-like consistency. At this point, it is typically removed from the heat, and sometimes apricot jam may be added for flavor and cake crumbs or matzo meal may be added as a binder and to help ensure the paste does not leak out of when used as a filling in baked goods. It is then allowed to cool and refrigerated prior to being used as a filling or spread. It has a shelf life of approximately 3 days.

In other cultures
In Hungary, a Poppy seed roll (Bejgli) is made for Christmas.

References

See also
Lekvar
Rugelach

Ashkenazi Jewish cuisine
Polish cuisine
Jewish baked goods
Jewish American cuisine
Israeli cuisine
Israeli culture
Desserts
Poppy seeds